Col de l'Épine (elevation ) is a paved mountain pass in the Aravis range in the Alps. Located in the department of the Haute-Savoie, it connects Marlens to Serraval. It is reached and crossed by the route départementale D16 local road.

Appearances in the Tour de France
The Tour de France crossed the Col de l'Épine in 1995, 2007 and 2013. 1995 and 2013 were categorized climbs.

References

Mountain passes of the Alps
Mountain passes of Auvergne-Rhône-Alpes
Haute-Savoie